Cellettes is a commune in the Charente department, Southwestern France.

Population

Gallery

See also
Communes of the Charente department

References

Communes of Charente